Ivan "Mogli" Lakićević (born 27 July 1993) is a Serbian footballer who plays as a right-back.

Club career
He was playing for young categories of Red Star Belgrade. He was a member of Donji Srem from 2011 to 2015. In June 2015, Lakićević joined Vojvodina.

Genoa
On 2 July 2018, Lakićević signed with Italian Serie A club Genoa.

On 24 July 2019, Lakićević joined Serie B club Venezia on loan until 30 June 2020.

Reggina
On 19 January 2021, he signed a 1.5-year contract with Serie B club Reggina.

Personal life
He is also known as "Mogli" (Mowgli) by a character from The Jungle Book. He is a big fan of R'n'R and heavy metal music.

References

External links
 
 Stats at utakmica.rs

1993 births
Living people
Footballers from Belgrade
Association football defenders
Serbian footballers
FK Donji Srem players
FK Vojvodina players
Genoa C.F.C. players
Venezia F.C. players
Reggina 1914 players
Serbian SuperLiga players
Serbian First League players
Serie B players
Serbian expatriate footballers
Serbian expatriate sportspeople in Italy
Expatriate footballers in Italy